Beijer is a surname. Notable people with the surname include:

 Barry Beijer (born 1989), Dutch footballer 
 Georg Beijers (1895–1978), Dutch footballer
 Inez Beijer (born 1995), Dutch racing cyclist
 Jan de Beijer (1703–1780), Dutch draughtsman
 Lennart Beijer (born 1947), Swedish politician
 Margareta Beijer (1625–1675), managing director of the Swedish Post Office

See also
 Beijer Electronics, Swedish technology company 
 Beijers park, park in Malmö, Sweden